Wisconsin Square is a small park on Norfolk, Virginia's Elizabeth River waterfront, opposite the berth of the berth of the , a museum ship. It contains memorials to the seamen lost while serving on United States Navy ships homeported in Norfolk.

Memorials 
Wisconsin Square contains memorials to fallen US Navy personnel that were home ported in Norfolk.

 , 30 sailors lost in 1948
 , for those lost in the 1967 USS Forrestal fire
 , for those killed in the 1967 USS Liberty incident
 , lost with all hands in 1968
 , for crew lost in a 1972 misfire

 , for the crew lost in the 1981 flight deck crash
 , for the crew lost in the 1989 turret explosion
 , for the crew lost in the 2000 suicide bombing
 The Pentagon, September 11, 2001

References 

Virginia municipal and county parks
Urban public parks
Parks in Norfolk, Virginia
Monuments and memorials in Virginia